Neocollyris labiomaculata is a species of ground beetle in the genus Neocollyris in the family Carabidae. It was described by Horn in 1892.

References

Labiomaculata, Neocollyris
Beetles described in 1892